Waitts Mountain is a summit in Malden, Middlesex County in the state of Massachusetts. It was named by the United States Geological Survey in 1894.

Background
Waitt's Mountain also has a historic park. It has the tallest point in Malden, with expansive views of the Boston skyline. In World War I it was home to a Fresh Air Camp, and in World War II had gun batteries. During the Battle of Bunker Hill, people observed the battle from Waitt's Mount.

References

External links
 Waitt's Mountain

Malden, Massachusetts
Mountains of Massachusetts
Mountains of Middlesex County, Massachusetts